Pavel Sedláček (born March 19, 1994) is a Czech ice hockey player. He currently plays for PSG Berani Zlín in the 1st Czech Republic Hockey League.

References

1994 births
Living people
Czech ice hockey left wingers
PSG Berani Zlín players
Sportspeople from Zlín